Claire St-Arnaud is a politician in Montreal, Quebec, Canada. She served on the Montreal city council from 1994 to 2009, representing the east-end division of Longue-Pointe. St-Arnaud was a member of Vision Montreal until resigning to sit as an independent in 2008.

City councillor
First term
St-Arnaud was first elected to city council in the 1994 municipal election, defeating incumbent councillor Nicole Boudreau of the Montreal Citizens' Movement (MCM). Vision Montreal won a majority government in this election under Pierre Bourque's leadership, and St-Arnaud served as a supporter of the administration. She was appointed as an assistant to Montreal executive committee chairman Noushig Eloyan and was given responsibility for community groups and for sports and recreation. In 1996, she took part in difficult negotiations with municipal day camps and oversaw fee increases for children's hockey, baseball, and soccer.

St-Arnaud became chair of the Montreal Urban Community's public security committee in February 1997. Soon after her appointment, she oversaw the adoption of a community policing initiative proposed by police chief Jacques Duchesneau. In 1998, she rejected a proposal by fellow Montreal councillor Marvin Rotrand for public consultation in the selection of the urban community's next chief.

She circulated a letter to other councillors in 1996, informing them that Montreal had a $125,000 surplus and encouraging them to apply for youth and anti-poverty funding. Montreal Gazette, while endorsing the funding initiatives, criticized St-Arnaud for only sending the letter to Vision Montreal councillors and not to members of the opposition. St-Arnaud responded that this had been an innocent mistake.

St-Arnaud was an ally of Mayor Bourque during Vision Montreal's internal divisions in the late 1990s. In March 1998, she joined Bourque in delivering a major statement on Montreal's medical health needs at a public hearing of the Montreal regional health board. 
Second term
St-Arnaud was re-elected in the 1998 municipal election, in which Vision Montreal won a second consecutive majority. She continued to serve as chair of the urban community's public security committee. In 2000, Gazette journalist Henry Aubin wrote a strongly critical editorial describing the committee as "mild and accommodating" to the police and describing St-Arnaud as "completely unknown to the public whom she theoretically represents." (Not long after this editorial was published, a large-scale riot took place in downtown Montreal during a vigil against police brutality. St-Arnaud asked the police for a full report on the matter.)

St-Arnaud also chaired a municipal committee on prostitution. In March 2000, she argued that repressive approaches such as arrests and prosecutions had not been successful and announced a pilot project in two districts aimed at getting prostitutes off the streets through social work. The project was cancelled following vociferous opposition from local residents, who feared it would result in increased prostitution and crime.
Third and fourth terms
St-Arnaud was elected to a third term in the 2001 municipal election, in which Vision Montreal was defeated by Gérald Tremblay's Montreal Island Citizens Union (MICU). During the term that followed, she served as both Vision Montreal council chair and leader of the official opposition party on city council (an equivalent position to that of House Leader in the House of Commons of Canada).

She was again returned for the renamed division of Maisonneuve–Longue-Pointe in the 2005 election, which was also won by MICU. She remained leader of the opposition party on council but was for a time replaced as caucus chair by François Purcell. Purcell resigned in 2007, and St-Arnaud resumed the office as his successor. She continued to serve in both capacities until November 28, 2008, when she resigned from Vision Montreal to sit as an independent.

St-Arnaud joined Tremblay's party, by now renamed as Union Montreal, in June 2009 and ran under its banner for borough mayor of Mercier–Hochelaga-Maisonneuve in the 2009 municipal election. She finished third against Vision candidate Réal Ménard.

From 2001 to 2009, St-Arnaud served on the Mercier–Hochelaga-Maisonneuve borough council by virtue of holding her seat on city council.

Electoral record

References

Living people
Montreal city councillors
People from Mercier–Hochelaga-Maisonneuve
Women in Quebec politics
Women municipal councillors in Canada
Year of birth missing (living people)